Frode Jacobsen (born 5 August 1968) is a Norwegian politician.

He was elected deputy representative to the Storting from the constituency of Oslo for the period 2021–2025, for the Labour Party. He replaced  Jonas Gahr Støre in the Storting from 2021 while  Støre is prime minister.

Jacobsen is a son of newspaper editor Arvid Jacobsen.

References

1968 births
Living people
Labour Party (Norway) politicians
Politicians from Oslo
Members of the Storting